Liu Chin-chiang (born 16 May 1958) is a Taiwanese athlete. He competed in the men's high jump at the 1984 Summer Olympics.

References

1958 births
Living people
Athletes (track and field) at the 1984 Summer Olympics
Taiwanese male high jumpers
Olympic athletes of Taiwan
Place of birth missing (living people)